Udagawa Katsutarō (born Hideo Udagawa; December 3, 1939 – July 24, 1989) was a sumo wrestler from Tokyo, Japan. He made his professional debut in September 1954 and reached the top division in January 1960. His highest rank was maegashira 3. Upon retirement from active competition he became an elder in the Japan Sumo Association under a series of different names, since he didn't own a toshiyori-kabu of his own. He left the Sumo Association in October 1977.

Career record
The Kyushu tournament was first held in 1957, and the Nagoya tournament in 1958.

See also
Glossary of sumo terms
List of past sumo wrestlers
List of sumo tournament second division champions

References

1939 births
Japanese sumo wrestlers
Sumo people from Tokyo
1989 deaths